"Get Down (You're the One for Me)" is a song by American boy band Backstreet Boys. It was released on April 30, 1996 as the third single from their international self-titled debut album (1996). It was later included on their US debut album.

Background
In some countries "Get Down" was released as their debut single. The song features a rap in the second verse by both Smooth T. of the group Fun Factory, and band member AJ McLean. When performed live, other than a few isolated cases in which Smooth T. was able to join the band, McLean raps alternate lyrics during Smooth T.'s verse. The alternate first rap verse was recorded for the song, and was used in the Markus Plastik Vocal Remix of the song is: "So get ready - ready for the flavor we are bringin' / It's time I set it off and get your body swingin' / When we're alone, girl, I wanna push up / Can I get it? (yeah!) Everybody throw your hands up."

Critical reception
British magazine Music Week rated the song four out of five, adding, "The US boy band have had two massive hits throughout Europe but are yet to break into the UK Top 40. This infectious, upbeat number should do it."

Music video

Background
The accompanying music video was directed by Alan Calzatti, and was filmed in Orlando on April 10, 1996. It was released in May 1996. As of March 2023, the video has over 57 million views on YouTube.

Synopsis
The band perform on the top-half of a disco ball, which is lit in a cold, bright, white light. They are also contained inside a second disco ball, with individual cabins containing several females dancing inside. Each member is seen wearing big black trousers and shoes, silver necklaces, and various oversized jackets; Nick wearing yellow and red, Brian wearing orange, Howie wearing black, AJ wearing dark yellow, and Kevin wearing bright yellow. Smooth T. appears and hovers around the band during his rap verse.

Track listing

European 12-inch single

German cassette single

German maxi single

Credits and personnel
Credits adapted from the single's liner notes.
Produced by Bülent Aris and Toni Cottura
Vocal Recording by Hakan Wollard at Matiz Studios, Hamburg, Germany
Rap by Toni Cottura
All Instruments programmed by Bülent Aris and Toni Cottura

Awards

Charts

Weekly charts

Year-end charts

References

1996 songs
1996 singles
Backstreet Boys songs
Jive Records singles
Dance-pop songs
Songs written by Toni Cottura
Songs written by Bülent Aris